The One and Only is an album by American country music artist Waylon Jennings, released in 1967 on RCA Camden.  It peaked at #19 on the Billboard country albums chart.

Background
"John's Back in Town" is a comic response to Johnny Cash's "The Singing Star's Queen" from Everybody Loves a Nut (1966), with an identical general concept.
During this time, Jennings rented an apartment in Nashville with Cash, who later recalled in the Jennings documentary Renegade Outlaw Rebel, "We had a mutual respect for each other as artists, and when we got to know each other we had so much in common: our love for music and, at that time, our love for chemicals." During the 1970s, RCA Records leased several recordings issued on the RCA Camden label to Pickwick Records; Pickwick reissued this album in 1976 as The Dark Side of Fame, without "It's All Over Now," which had been previously recorded by the Rolling Stones.  The album also includes the popular Roy Orbison hit "Dream Baby."  Matt Fink of AllMusic: "Though there's nothing here in particular to get excited about, there's enough to keep the casual fan interested."

Track listing
 "Yes, Virginia" (Liz Anderson) – 2:34
 "Dream Baby" (Cindy Walker) – 2:29
 "You Beat All I Ever Saw" (Johnny Cash) – 2:21
 "She Loves Me (She Don't Love You)" (Conway Twitty) – 2:22
 "It's All Over Now" (Bobby Womack, Shirley Jean Womack) – 2:16
 "Born to Love You" (Woody Starr) – 2:34
 "Down Came the World" (Bozo Darnell, Waylon Jennings) – 2:19
 "The Dark Side of Fame" (Ted Harris) – 2:35
 "John's Back in Town" (Waylon Jennings, Bill Mack) – 2:03
 "Listen, They're Playing My Song" (Charlie Williams, Glen Garrison) – 2:50

References

External links
 Waylon Jennings' official website

Waylon Jennings albums
1967 albums
RCA Records albums
Albums produced by Chet Atkins